The Tschudi Group is a private shipping and logistics company, established in 1883. The company is now owned and run by the fourth and fifth generations of the Tschudi family. The head office is located in Lysaker, Norway.

The Group's main commercial competences are shipping and maritime services, logistics and offshore. The Group is active in ship management, offering commercial, technical management and crewing services primarily to third party clients. The Tschudi Group has offices in Norway, Finland, Denmark, Sweden, the Netherlands, Russia, Estonia, Ukraine, Switzerland, Poland, Angola, Mozambique and China. 
  
The Group has significant activities in Northern Norway and the Arctic, including the Sydvaranger group of mining-related companies, companies owning ports/terminals, real estate and aggregates businesses in Kirkenes (the Tschudi Kirkenes group), and transshipment and other logistics operations related to the Northern Sea Route.

Shipping companies of Norway
Container shipping companies
Eitzen Group